The Inklin River (Lingít: Héen Tlein) is a tributary of the Taku River in the northwest part of the province of British Columbia, Canada. The confluence of the Inklin and Nakina Rivers, at the uninhabited locality of Inklin,  marks the beginning of the Taku River.

The river forms the southwestern boundary of the Taku Plateau, the northwesternmost sub-plateau of the Stikine Plateau. Along the river's southeast are the Boundary Ranges of the Coast Mountains.

The lower Inklin River flows through the Nakina–Inklin Rivers/Yáwu Yaa Conservancy.

Major tributaries of the Inklin River include Yeth Creek, Sutlahine River, Kaustua Creek, Kowatua Creek, Teditua Creek, and its headwater rivers, the Nahlin and Sheslay Rivers.

See also
List of British Columbia rivers

References 

Atlin District
Rivers of British Columbia
Rivers of the Boundary Ranges
Taku Plateau
Tlingit